Conor Glass (born 28 September 1997) is a Gaelic footballer and former professional Australian rules footballer who played for the Hawthorn Football Club in the Australian Football League (AFL). He signed with Hawthorn as a category B rookie in October 2015 and was subsequently drafted with their fourth selection and sixty-second overall in the 2016 rookie draft. He retired at the end of the 2020 season and returned to Ireland.

Sporting career
Glass captained the Derry minors side in the All-Ireland semi-finals. Glass was recruited by Hawthorn as a class B rookie in 2015. Arriving in Australia in July 2016, Glass played 6 games for the Box Hill development squad that included the squad's victorious grand final team.
After a full summer pre-season training regime, Glass had played 12 games in the Box Hill's senior team before getting a call up for the Hawthorn team.

AFL career
Glass was widely seen as performing well in his debut. Glass performed well throughout the rest of the season, and on August 2, 2017, he signed a two-year rookie/player contract extension to stay on Hawthorn's rookie list until the end of 2018.

Glass played only four senior games in 2018, but despite this was seen as having improved his skills during the year.

Glass was elevated to the senior list in 2019.

Glass played four games in 2020 and decided to return to Ireland at season's end.

GAA career
Glass made his debut for Derry against Longford in the 2020 National Football League, a fixture delayed by many months due to the pandemic.

During the first half of the 2022 All-Ireland Senior Football Championship semi-final game against Galway, a Glass effort at scoring a point was ruled wide by Hawk-Eye. That decision came under scrutiny when Hawk-Eye was shown to have malfunctioned later in the game by overturning an umpire decision's to award a point to Galway player Shane Walsh. He won an All Star at the end of the season.

Statistics

|- style=background:#EAEAEA
| 2016 ||  || 44
| 0 || — || — || — || — || — || — || — || — || — || — || — || — || — || — || 0
|-
| 2017 ||  || 44
| 6 || 0 || 0 || 45 || 31 || 76 || 20 || 17 || 0.0 || 0.0 || 7.5 || 5.2 || 12.7 || 3.3 || 2.8 || 0
|- style=background:#EAEAEA
| 2018 ||  || 44
| 4 || 0 || 0 || 31 || 17 || 48 || 11 || 13 || 0.0 || 0.0 || 7.8 || 4.3 || 12.0 || 2.8 || 3.3 || 0
|-
| 2019 ||  || 13
| 7 || 1 || 1 || 57 || 38 || 95 || 25 || 10 || 0.1 || 0.1 || 8.1 || 5.4 || 13.6 || 3.6 || 1.4 || 0
|- style=background:#EAEAEA
| 2020 ||  || 13
| 4 || 1 || 0 || 26 || 16 || 42 || 13 || 10 || 0.3 || 0.0 || 6.5 || 4.0 || 10.5 || 3.3 || 2.4 || 0
|- class="sortbottom"
! colspan=3| Career
! 21 !! 2 !! 1 !! 159 !! 102 !! 261 !! 69 !! 50 !! 0.1 !! 0.0 !! 7.6 !! 4.9 !! 12.4 !! 3.3 !! 2.4 || 0
|}

Notes

Honours and achievements
Team
 VFL premiership player: 2018

Individual
  best first year player (debut season): 2017
 All Star (1): 2022

References

External links

1997 births
Living people
All Stars Awards winners (football)
Box Hill Football Club players
Derry inter-county Gaelic footballers
Glen Gaelic footballers
Gaelic footballers who switched code
Hawthorn Football Club players
Irish players of Australian rules football
VFL/AFL players born outside Australia